Mary Waller may refer to:
 Mary Ella Waller, American writer and educator
 Mary Lemon Waller, British portrait painter